Sir Henry Ludlow (1592–1643) was an English landowner and politician who sat in the House of Commons at various times between 1614 and 1643.

Ludlow was born at Maiden Bradley, Wiltshire, the son of Sir Edmund Ludlow and his second wife Lady Margaret Howard, widow of Thomas Howard, 1st Viscount Howard of Bindon, and daughter of Sir Henry Manning, knight marshal of the Household. He matriculated at Brasenose College, Oxford on 16 October 1607 aged 15 and graduated BA on 6 February 1609. In 1614, he was elected Member of Parliament for Heytesbury. He was re-elected MP for Heytesbury in 1621 and 1624. He inherited the estate of Maiden Bradley. In 1633 he was Sheriff of Wiltshire.

In November 1640, Ludlow was elected MP for Wiltshire in the Long Parliament and sat until his death in 1643.

Ludlow died at the age of about 51 and was buried on 1 November 1643 at St Andrews, Holborn, London.

Ludlow married Elizabeth Phelips, daughter of Richard Phelips of Montacute, Somerset and had three daughters and six sons including Edmund, the regicide. Ludlow's half-brother also named Henry was an MP.

References

 

1592 births
1643 deaths
English MPs 1614
English MPs 1621–1622
English MPs 1624–1625
English MPs 1640–1648
Henry
Members of the Parliament of England (pre-1707) for Wiltshire